Derbyshire County Cricket Club in 1993 was the cricket season when the English club Derbyshire  won the Benson & Hedges Cup.  The club  had been playing for one hundred and twenty-two years. In the County Championship, they won four matches to  finish fifteenth in their ninetieth season in the Championship. They were eliminated in round two of the  National Westminster Bank Trophy and came eleventh in the AXA Equity and Law League.

1993 season

Derbyshire played seventeen matches in the County Championship, one against Cambridge University, and one against the touring Australians. They won four first class matches overall, drawing in the non-championship games. They won seven matches in the Sunday league.  

Kim Barnett was in his tenth season as captain. John Morris was top scorer although Chris Adams scored most runs in the one-day game. Devon Malcolm took most wickets, although Simon Base was most successful in the one-day league. The 5th wicket stand of 302 by John Morris and Dominic Cork against Gloucestershire became a Derbyshire record. 

The season saw the debuts of Adrian Rollins, Gary Steer and Matthew Vandrau who all played in the following season. Rollins was brought in as an additional wicket-keeper.

Matches

First Class
{| class="wikitable" width="100%"
! bgcolor="#efefef" colspan=6 | List of  matches
|- bgcolor="#efefef"
!No.
!Date
!V
!Result 
!Margin
!Notes
|-
|1
|14 Apr 1993 
| Cambridge University   FP Fenner's Ground, Cambridge 
|bgcolor="#FFCC00"|Drawn
 | 
|    JE Morris  136; TJG O'Gorman 130 
|- 
|2
|6 May 1993 
| Warwickshire Edgbaston, Birmingham 
 |bgcolor="#00FF00"|Won
| Innings and 72 runs
|    JE Morris  95 
|- 
|3
|13 May 1993 
| Glamorgan   County Ground, Derby 
|bgcolor="#FF0000"|Lost
 | 191 runs
|    H Morris 100; Maynard 145; Watkin 5-71 
|- 
|4
|20 May 1993 
| Essex   County Ground, Chelmsford 
|bgcolor="#FFCC00"|Drawn
 | 
|    Malik 132; Hussain 152; KJ Barnett 130 
|- 
|5
|27 May 1993 
| Hampshire   County Ground, Derby 
|bgcolor="#FFCC00"|Drawn
 | 
|    R Smith 101 
|- 
|6
|3 Jun 1993 
| Middlesex     Lord's Cricket Ground, St John's Wood 
|bgcolor="#FF0000"|Lost
 | 10 wickets
|     
|- 
|7
|10 Jun 1993 
| Yorkshire  Queen's Park, Chesterfield 
|bgcolor="#FFCC00"|Drawn
 | 
|    No play on two days 
|- 
|8
|17 Jun 1993 
| Kent  St Lawrence Ground, Canterbury 
|bgcolor="#FF0000"|Lost
 | 9 wickets
|    McCague 5-34; SJ Base 5-93 
|- 
|9
|24 Jun 1993 
| Lancashire   County Ground, Derby 
|bgcolor="#FF0000"|Lost
 | 111 runs
|    Atherton 137; Akram 117 and 6-45; KJ Barnett 161; JE Morris  151; DE Malcolm 5-98; DeFreitas 5-109  
|- 
|10
|1 Jul 1993 
|  Worcestershire Chester Road North Ground, Kidderminster 
|bgcolor="#FF0000"|Lost
 | 9 wickets
|    Weston 109; Hick 173; KJ Barnett 168; SJ Base 5-82 
|- 
|11
|13 Jul 1993 
|Australians    County Ground, Derby 
|bgcolor="#FFCC00"|Drawn
 | 
|    KJ Barnett 114; Slater 133; Holdsworth 5-117 
|- 
|12
|22 Jul 1993 
|  Sussex    County Ground, Derby 
 |bgcolor="#00FF00"|Won
| 195 runs
|    JE Morris  104; SJ Base 5-59; DE Malcolm 6-57 
|- 
|13
|29 Jul 1993 
|  Gloucestershire    College Ground, Cheltenham 
|bgcolor="#00FF00"|Won
 | 7 wickets
|    JE Morris  229; DG Cork 104; Broad 120; AE Warner 5-27 and 5-93
|- 
|14
|5 Aug 1993 
| Durham   The Racecourse, Durham University Grounds, Durham 
|bgcolor="#FFCC00"|Drawn
 | 
|    OH Mortensen 5-55 
|- 
|15
|12 Aug 1993 
| SomersetCounty Ground, Derby 
|bgcolor="#FF0000"|Lost
 | Innings and 97 runs
|    Hayhurst 169; Lathwell 109; Caddick 5-49; Mallender 5-49 
|- 
|16
|19 Aug 1993 
|  Surrey  Rutland Recreation Ground, Ilkeston 
|bgcolor="#00FF00"|Won
 | 6 wickets
|    PD Bowler 143; JE Morris  127; Hollioake 123; AE Warner 5-57 
|- 
|17
|26 Aug 1993 
| Nottinghamshire    Trent Bridge, Nottingham 
|bgcolor="#FFCC00"|Drawn
 | 
|    Pollard 180; Dessaur 104; PD Bowler 153; CJ Adams 175 
|- 
|18
|9 Sep 1993 
| Northamptonshire   County Ground, Derby 
|bgcolor="#FF0000"|Lost
 | Innings and 46 runs
|    Bailey 103; Ambrose 6-49 
|- 
|19
|16 Sep 1993 
| Leicestershire  Grace Road, Leicester 
|bgcolor="#FFCC00"|Drawn
| 
|     
|-

AXA Equity and Law League 
{| class="wikitable" width="100%"
! bgcolor="#efefef" colspan=6 | List of  matches
|- bgcolor="#efefef"
!No.
!Date
!V
!Result 
!Margin
!Notes
 |- 
|1
|9 May 1993
| Warwickshire Edgbaston, Birmingham 
|bgcolor="#FF0000"|Lost
 | 3 wickets
|     
|- 
|2
|16 May 1993
| Glamorgan   County Ground, Derby 
|bgcolor="#00FF00"|Won
 | 3 runs
|    PD Bowler 96; SR Barwick 6-28 
|- 
|3
|23 May 1993
| Essex   County Ground, Chelmsford 
|bgcolor="#00FF00"|Won
 | 2 wickets
|     
|- 
|4
|30 May 1993
| Hampshire   Uttoxeter Road, Checkley  
| Abandoned 
| 
|     
|- 
|5
|6 Jun 1993
| Middlesex     Lord's Cricket Ground, St John's Wood 
|bgcolor="#FF0000"|Lost
| 2 wickets
|    PD Bowler 104 
|- 
|6
|13 Jun 1993
| Yorkshire  Queen's Park, Chesterfield 
|bgcolor="#FF0000"|Lost
 | 9 wickets
|    Byas 106 
|- 
|7
|20 Jun 1993
| Kent  St Lawrence Ground, Canterbury 
|bgcolor="#00FF00"|Won
 | 3 runs
|     
|- 
|8
|27 Jun 1993
| Lancashire   County Ground, Derby 
|bgcolor="#FF0000"|Lost
 | 161 runs
|    Atherton 105 
|- 
|9
|4 Jul 1993
|  WorcestershireCounty Ground, New Road, Worcester 
|bgcolor="#00FF00"|Won
 | 5 wickets
|     
|- 
|10
|25 Jul 1993
|  Sussex    County Ground, Derby 
 |bgcolor="#00FF00"|Won
| 81 runs
|     
|- 
|11
|1 Aug 1993
|  Gloucestershire    College Ground, Cheltenham 
|bgcolor="#00FF00"|Won
 | 8 wickets
|     
|- 
|12
|8 Aug 1993
| Durham   The Racecourse, Durham University Grounds, Durham 
|bgcolor="#FF0000"|Lost
 | 112 runs
|    Fowler 124 
|- 
|13
|15 Aug 1993
| SomersetCounty Ground, Derby 
 |bgcolor="#00FF00"|Won
| 113 runs
|    PD Bowler 138 
|- 
|14
|22 Aug 1993
|  Surrey  Rutland Recreation Ground, Ilkeston 
|bgcolor="#FF0000"|Lost
 | 5 wickets
|     
|- 
|15
|29 Aug 1993
| Nottinghamshire    Trent Bridge, Nottingham 
|bgcolor="#FF0000"|Lost
 | 142 runs
|     
|- 
|16
|12 Sep 1993
| Northamptonshire   County Ground, Derby 
|bgcolor="#FFCC00"|No Result
 | 
|     
|- 
|17
|19 Sep 1993
| Leicestershire  Grace Road, Leicester 
|bgcolor="#FF0000"|Lost
| 14 runs
|     
|- 
|

National Westminster Bank Trophy 
{| class="wikitable" width="100%"
! bgcolor="#efefef" colspan=6 | List of  matches
|- bgcolor="#efefef"
!No.
!Date
!V
!Result 
!Margin
!Notes
 |- 
|1st Round
|22 Jun 1993
| Devon The Maer Ground, Exmouth 
|bgcolor="#00FF00"|Won
| 133 runs
 |-
|2nd Round
|7 Jul 1993
|  Worcestershire  County Ground, New Road, Worcester 
|bgcolor="#FF0000"|Lost
| 4 wickets
|- 
|

Benson and Hedges Cup
 {| class="wikitable" width="100%"
! bgcolor="#efefef" colspan=6 | List of  matches
|- bgcolor="#efefef"
!No.
!Date
!V
!Result 
!Margin
!Notes
 |- 
|Prelim round
|27 Apr 1993
|  Gloucestershire   The Royal & Sun Alliance County Ground, Bristol  
|bgcolor="#00FF00"|Won
 | Lost fewer wickets
|     
|-
|1st Round
|11 May 1993
| Middlesex   County Ground, Derby 
|bgcolor="#00FF00"|Won
 | 14 runs
|     
|- 
|Quarter Final
|25 May 1993
| SomersetCounty Ground, Taunton 
|bgcolor="#FFCC00"|No Result
 | Decided on a bowl-out 6-3 
|    
|- 
|- 
|Semi-final
|   8 Jun 1993
| Northamptonshire   County Ground, Derby 
 |bgcolor="#00FF00"|Won
 |  8 wickets
|     
|- 
|Final
| 10 Jul 1993
 | Lancashire   Lord's Cricket Ground, St John's Wood  
|bgcolor="#00FF00"|Won
|6 runs
|-
|

Statistics

Competition batting averages

Competition bowling averages

Wicket Keeping
KM Krikken
County Championship Catches 20, Stumping 4
AXA League  Catches 16, Stumping 1

Rollins
County Championship Catches 5, Stumping 1

See also
Derbyshire County Cricket Club seasons
1993 English cricket season

References

1993 in English cricket
Derbyshire County Cricket Club seasons